Donald Leslie Grant Hazelwood AO OBE (born 1 March 1930) is a celebrated Australian violinist and concert master.

Career

1952-1998
Donald Hazelwood first played with the Sydney Symphony Orchestra in 1952, as a second violinist under Eugene Goossens.

In 1965 he was appointed co-concertmaster with Robert Miller, later becoming concertmaster, a position he held for 33 years until his retirement in 1998.

From 1988 to 1989 Donald Hazelwood was Artistic Director of the National Ensemble at the Sydney Conservatorium of Music.

From 1989 to 1991 and in 1996 he was Director of the Australian Youth Orchestra National Music Camp.

He is a life member of Australian Youth Orchestra.

In 1997 Hazelwood had a tribute concert at the Sydney Opera House, where he performed Dvorak's Romance in F minor with the Sydney Symphony.

In 1998 he retired as concertmaster after 33 years with the Orchestra.

Personal life
His first wife Anne Menzies was a clarinetist with the Sydney Symphony Orchestra for 26 years until 1994.  Their daughter Jane Hazelwood is a violist. Their son-in-law is the violinist Carl Pini. After Anne Menzies' death, Donald remarried in 2000 to Helen Phillips.

He played a Giovanni Baptista Grancino violin made in 1716. The violin made of Australian timbers by the Australian violin maker, Graham Caldersmith in 2003.

Works

Individuals 
 Flautist James Galway (Bach's Brandenburg concertos Nos. 4 & 5 in 1990)

Groups

Spokane Symphony Orchestra 
Donald Hazelwood represented Australia at the 1974 Expo in Spokane, Washington by performing Tchaikovsky's Violin Concerto in D with the Spokane Symphony Orchestra.

World Philharmonic Orchestra 
Donald Hazelwood was one of two Australian musicians chosen to participate in the performance of the World Philharmonic Orchestra in Stockholm in 1985.

Austral String Quartet 
Hazelwood was leader of the Austral String Quartet and made two world tours with the group.

Hazelwood Trio 
Donald Hazelwood made four tours of Asia with the Hazelwood Trio, a group including his wife, Anne Menzies and pianist Rachel Valler. The final tour was made in 1997.

ABC Orchestra 
Donald Hazelwood has performed as a soloist with the Australian Broadcasting Corporation orchestras on many occasions, including:
 Barry Conyngham's work Ice Carving for Violin Solo and Strings
 Peter Sculthorpe's Irkanda IV (released on CD)
 Violin concertos by Elgar (B minor) and Bruch (No. 1 in G minor)
 Solo appearances at Under the Stars in 1992 and 1995.

Family
His first wife Anne Menzies was a clarinetist with the Sydney Symphony Orchestra for 26 years until 1994.  Their daughter Jane Hazelwood is a violist. Their son-in-law is the violinist Carl Pini. After Anne Menzies' death, Donald remarried in 2000 to Helen Phillips.

Awards 
Donald was appointed an Officer of the Order of the British Empire (OBE) in 1976 and was made an Officer of the Order of Australia (AO) in 1988 for his services to music.

Bernard Heinze Memorial Award
The Sir Bernard Heinze Memorial Award is given to a person who has made an outstanding contribution to music in Australia.

|-
| 1997 || Donald Hazelwood|| Sir Bernard Heinze Memorial Award ||   
|-

External links 
 Portrait of Donald Hazelwood (1986), Music Australia.
 Australian Trio in Concert, Australian High Commission for Brunie Durassalam.

References 

Living people
1930 births
Australian classical violinists
Male classical violinists
Concertmasters
Officers of the Order of Australia
Australian Officers of the Order of the British Empire
21st-century classical violinists
21st-century Australian male musicians
21st-century Australian musicians